Protorhopala is a genus of longhorn beetles of the subfamily Lamiinae, containing the following species:

 Protorhopala elegans Pascoe, 1875
 Protorhopala picta (Fairmaire, 1899)
 Protorhopala sexnotata (Klug, 1833)

References

Pteropliini